Utetheisa perryi is a moth in the family Erebidae. It was described by Alan H. Hayes in 1975. It is found on the Galápagos Islands.

References

Moths described in 1975
perryi